Weimar station is the main station in the city of Weimar in the German state of Thuringia, located on the Thuringian Railway. It is an Intercity-Express stop on the line between Frankfurt am Main and Dresden. Weimar station is classified by Deutsche Bahn as a category 3 station. It is officially designated as a KulturBahnhof ("culture station”), as the station's panels are noted. It is about one kilometre north of central Weimar at the end of the street of Carl-August-Allee.

History 
The station was built in 1846 as a terminus of the Thuringian Railway from Halle. In 1847 the line was continued west to Erfurt, and to Bebra in 1849. In 1876 this was followed by a second line to Jena and Gera. In 1887, a third line opened to Bad Berka, Kranichfeld and Blankenhain (the Ilm Valley Railway). In the same year, a fourth line was connected to the station, the metre gauge Weimar-Rastenberg Railway line to Großrudestedt in Sömmerda. It was closed in 1946.

During the period of the Weimar Republic, Weimar was the state capital of Thuringia. Therefore, a new, prestigious reception building was built at that time in the neo-classical style. Under Nazism the station played a special role as the beginning a line for the transport of prisoners to Buchenwald concentration camp.

During the existence of East Germany the line from Naumburg to Erfurt was electrified. Weimar station had 116 regular arrivals and departures of long-distance trains in the summer timetable of 1989, making it the fifth place station in the network of the East German railways.

Train services
The station has five platforms. The following services call at the station:
Regional-Express (RE) 1: Göttingen–Erfurt–Weimar–Jena–Gera–Zwickau/Chemnitz (Weimar–Gera railway, two hourly, alternating with RE 3)
RE 3: Erfurt–Weimar–Jena–Gera (two hourly alternating with RE 1)
Regionalbahn (RB) 20: Eisenach–Erfurt–Halle–Weimar (Thuringian Railway, hourly)
RB 21: Weimar–Jena–Gera (two hourly)
RB 54: Weimar–Kranichfeld (Ilm Valley Railway, hourly)

The station is served by the following service(s):

Notes

Railway stations in Thuringia
Buildings and structures in Weimar
Railway stations in Germany opened in 1846
Neoclassical architecture in Germany